An indirect election took place in Estonia in 2016 to elect the president of Estonia, who is the country's head of state. The Riigikogu — the Parliament of Estonia — elected Kersti Kaljulaid to be the next head of state of Estonia to succeed Toomas Hendrik Ilves, who had served his second and final term as president (as he was term-limited). Kaljulaid is the first female head of state of Estonia.

Somewhat unusually, Kaljulaid was elected president only after other candidates could not be elected in three rounds of parliamentary voting and two rounds of voting by an electoral college consisting of members of Parliament and representatives of local governments of Estonia.

Process
By law, the president of Estonia is indirectly elected. The Riigikogu (Parliament) has the task of electing the president in the first instance. If no candidate received the required supermajority of two-thirds (68 votes out of 101), the president is selected by an electoral college consisting of MPs and representatives of local (municipal) governments. Failing that, the process is to return to the parliament yet again.

The first three rounds of the election took place in the Riigikogu on 29 August 2016 (first round) and 30 August 2016 (second and third rounds). Since no candidate received the required supermajority in three balloting rounds, an electoral college convened on 24 September consisting of members of Riigikogu and representatives of Estonia's local governments. The electoral college voted twice, but no candidate managed to reach an absolute majority of 168 votes. Thus, the next round of the election returned to Riigikogu on 3 October. The parliament elected Kersti Kaljulaid, then the country's representative to the European Court of Auditors, as the next President of Estonia.

The incumbent, President Toomas Hendrik Ilves, having served the maximum two terms, was not eligible to run for re-election.

In the Parliament

Candidates

Candidates could be nominated by one-fifth of the members of Riigikogu (21 MPs).

On 30 May 2016, Social Democratic Party endorsed Eiki Nestor as the party's candidate, but lacked MPs to officially support the bid. Same day the Pro Patria and Res Publica Union's Parliamentary Group endorsed Allar Jõks. On 8 August, Jõks was also endorsed by the Estonian Free Party, after which he had enough backing for official candidacy.

On 11 June 2016, with 53% of the votes the Centre Party elected Mailis Reps as their presidential candidate, in preference to Edgar Savisaar.

On 12 June 2016, the Conservative People's Party of Estonia decided to nominate Mart Helme for president. As none of the other parties supported Helme's candidacy, he was left out of the election. Ambassador and former Minister of Defence Jaak Jõerüüt also prepared to run for president, but did not gain support from any party.

On 3 August 2016, the Reform Party nominated Siim Kallas as the party's official candidate. Marina Kaljurand and Urmas Paet had also announced interest in running, although Kaljurand stated that she was interested in doing so only if the electoral college was convened. On 23 August, Reform Party and Social Democratic Party made a pact to support Nestor's nomination and to vote for him in the first round of voting and, if this is unsuccessful, to support Kallas in the second and third rounds.

Election results at the parliament

In the Electoral College

Candidates

After the members of Riigikogu failed to elect the president, the electoral college was called to convene and the nomination procedure started over. Each candidate needed 21 members of the electoral college to nominate them. As Kallas and Reps were in the last voting round in the Riigikogu, they automatically qualified as candidates.

On 30 August 2016, the Reform Party decided to support Siim Kallas in the electoral college, whilst Marina Kaljurand was also interested in running. After the decision, Kaljurand announced that she would step down from her position as Minister of Foreign Affairs and would run for presidency without the support from the Reform Party. Her presidential bid was then supported by the Social Democratic Party.

Both the Free Party and Pro Patria and Res Publica Union decided to keep backing Allar Jõks in the electoral college and gathered enough signatures for nomination.

On 20 September, the chairman of Conservative People's Party of Estonia Mart Helme announced that he had gathered enough signatures for nomination.

Results at the electoral college

Back to the Parliament

Candidates

After the electoral college failed to elect the president, the election returned to the Parliament and the nomination procedure started over. After the results of the electoral college were announced, Jõks stated that he would not run again. Helme also announced that he wouldn't run again and argued that all other previous candidates should do the same, as "new candidates were needed". Later, Kaljurand also announced that she wouldn't run again.

On 27 September, a "council of elders" of Riigikogu (consisting of the speaker, vice-speakers, and leaders of all party factions) met in order to find a common candidate for all parties. They decided to propose Kersti Kaljulaid, the Estonian auditor in the European Court of Auditors. The proposal was received positively by the parliamentary parties, most of the MPs supporting Kaljulaid's election. On 30 September 2016, Kaljulaid was officially nominated by 90 MPs. As there were not enough uncommitted MPs left to nominate another candidate, Kaljulaid was the sole candidate in the election.

Results

Opinion polls
Even though the president was not elected by popular vote, there were numerous public opinion polls studying candidates' popularity.

References

Presidential elections in Estonia
Estonia
2016 in Estonia